Orin William Angwall  or Orin W. Angwall (September 18, 1890 – December 6, 1974) was an American lake captain, commercial fisherman, and politician.  He served in the Wisconsin legislature and was mayor of Marinette.

Biography
Angwall was born in Marinette, Wisconsin. He was a lake captain from 1912 to 1932 and later a commercial fisherman. Angwall served on the Marinette common council and was mayor of Marinette in 1947 and 1948.

Angwall served in the Wisconsin State Assembly in 1943 and 1945 as a Republican. He was a member of the Committee on Conservation and the Committee on Revision. Angwall was a delegate to the 1944 Republican National Convention However, in 1948, after initially leading at the polls, he was defeated as a delegate.  Angwall also served on the Republican party's State Central Committee in the same year.

Angwall served as president of the Marinette Chamber of Commerce and also on the Marinette city police and fire commission. Later he was president of the Glenwood Pipeline Company in Arkansas City, Kansas. Angwall ultimately retired in Menominee, Michigan.

Boats owned 
He was the owner of the fishing schooner Hustler, which exploded and sank without loss of life in Green Bay in 1917.

In 1927 he came to own the flat-bottomed scow schooner, City of Grand Haven, which was built by Duncan Robertson and was originally owned by Kirby, Furlong & Co.

He owned the J.H. Stevens, an 1859 schooner constructed by D. Edwards at Milan, Ohio. On June 10, 1927, while owned by Angwall, the ship burned near Presque Isle, Michigan. There were no deaths.

From 1944 to 1971, he owned the Kate A, a Fish Tug built by Marinette Marine Corporation.

He was also the owner of a unique ship: the Mindemoya (Propeller)  later rechristened the Yankcanuck when it was owned by the Yankcanuck Transportation Company  which was the last composite constructed vessel sailing the Great Lakes.

Legacy

Angwall was married to Mary Ellen (née Maguire) Angwall. They had three children, two daughters  Margaret and Helen  and one son. Their son, Robert O. Angwall, also became a Great Lakes Captain and Marinette businessman and civic leader. Angwall died in Menoninee December 6, 1974. His and Mary's remains are interred at Forest Home Cemetery in Marinette.

Archival material

References

Notes

Citations

Further reading

External links

1890 births
1974 deaths
People from Marinette, Wisconsin
Businesspeople from Wisconsin
Wisconsin city council members
Mayors of places in Wisconsin
Republican Party members of the Wisconsin State Assembly
20th-century American politicians
People from Menominee, Michigan
20th-century American businesspeople